The Loviisa Nuclear Power Plant (NPP) is located close to the Finnish town of Loviisa. It houses two Soviet-designed VVER-440 PWR reactors, with capacities of 507 MW each. It is one of Finland's two operating nuclear power plants, the other being the three-unit Olkiluoto Nuclear Power Plant.

History
The reactors at Loviisa NPP went into commercial operation in 1977 and 1981 respectively. To comply with Finnish nuclear regulation, Westinghouse and Siemens supplied equipment and engineering expertise. This unorthodox mix of Western and Soviet enterprise led to the project developers being given the nickname "Eastinghouse". The plant is operated by Fortum Oyj.

In 1996, the pressure vessel of Unit 1 was successfully heat annealed in order to clear embrittlement caused by neutron bombardment and impurities of the welding seam between the two halves of the vessel.

The operating licence for both units has been renewed for a 50-year lifetime, Loviisa-1 to 2027 and Loviisa-2 to 2030.  Fortum is reportedly considering applying for a further 20-year lifetime extension until 2050, which is a change from plans just a year earlier that would have seen the plant decommissioned on the earlier schedule.

Fortum Power and Heat Oy applied to build a third reactor unit, to produce up to 1,000 MWth of district heating supply and from 800-1,600 MW of electrical generation, which the Finnish government declined on 21 April 2010.

Spent fuel from the reactors were planned to be stored permanently at the Onkalo spent nuclear fuel repository operated by Posiva.

In 2014 Rolls-Royce took over the modernisation of safety-related systems for both units from an AREVA-Siemens consortium and the project was completed in 2018. Since then, both Unit 1 and Unit 2 are operating at a nominal 507 MW capacity after updates.

In 2022, Fortum submitted a plan for the reactors' life extension to 2050. Russia's TVEL will continue to supply fuel until the contracts come up for renewal in 2027 and 2030, when Westinghouse Sweden may have developed an alternative.

See also

Energy in Finland
Nuclear power in Finland

References

Nucler Power Plant
Nuclear power stations in Finland
Nuclear power stations using pressurized water reactors
Finland–Soviet Union relations
Nuclear power stations using VVER reactors
Buildings and structures in Uusimaa
Energy infrastructure completed in 1977
1977 establishments in Finland
Fortum